Seddon is an English-language surname. Notable people with the surname include:

Bill Seddon (1901–1993), English footballer
Chris Seddon (born 1983), American Major League baseball pitcher
Frederick Seddon (1870–1912), British murderer
Gareth Seddon (born 1980), English footballer
George Seddon (academic) (1927–2007), Australian academic
George Seddon (cabinetmaker) (1727–1801), English cabinetmaker
 Sir Herbert Seddon (1903–1977), British orthopaedic surgeon and nerve researcher
James Seddon (1815–1880), American lawyer and politician
Jimmy Seddon (1895–1971), English footballer
John Seddon, British occupational psychologist
John Seddon (Unitarian) (1719–1769), English Unitarian minister
John Seddon of Warrington (1725–1770), English dissenter minister
John Pollard Seddon (1827–1906), English architect
Ken Seddon (1950–2018), English chemist
Margaret Seddon (1872–1968), American film actress
Margaret Rhea Seddon (born 1947), American physician and NASA astronaut
Mark Seddon (born 1962), British journalist
Patsy Seddon, Scottish harpist
Richard Seddon (1845–1906), the longest-serving Prime Minister of New Zealand
Robert Seddon (1860–1888), England and British Lion rugby player
Steve Seddon (born 1997), English footballer
Thomas Seddon (1884–1972), New Zealand politician, Richard Seddon's son
Thomas Seddon (1821–1856), English landscape painter

Fictional characters:
Lewis Seddon, character in British TV series Waterloo Road